The Palace of the Argentine National Congress (often referred locally as Palacio del Congreso) is a monumental building, seat of the Argentine National Congress, located in the city of Buenos Aires. It is located in the barrio of Balvanera at its limit with Monserrat, an area informally known as the Congreso neighbourhood.

Constructed between 1898 and 1906, the palace is a National Historic Landmark. The Kilometre Zero for all Argentine National Highways is marked on a milestone at the Congressional Plaza, next to the building.

History

The idea of a congressional palace was first proposed and decreed in 1895.

Designed by the Italian architect Vittorio Meano and completed by Argentine architect Julio Dormal, the building was under construction between 1898 and 1906. Inaugurated that year, its aesthetic details were not completed until 1946. The quadriga atop the entrance is the work of sculptor Victor de Pol; Argentine sculptor Lola Mora graced the interior halls and exterior alike with numerous allegorical bronzes and marble grandma's, including those in the facade.

The edifice was built at a cost of US$6 million allocated by the federal government.

The building was officially accepted by Congress on 12 May 1906. As time went by, the building proved too small for its purpose, and in 1974 the construction of the Annex, which now holds the Deputies' offices, was started.

From 1976 to 1983 the palace housed the Legislative Advisory Commission (CAL), which was a group of officers from the three Armed Forces.

Congressional Plaza, built by French Argentine urbanist Charles Thays, faces the palace. Popular among tourists since its inauguration in 1910, the plaza is also a preferred location for protesters and those who want to voice their opinion about congressional activities.

Architecture

The palace is in Neoclassical style, largely made of white marble with elaborately furnished interiors, especially in the Lost Steps Hall and the Blue Room. It is crowned by a bronze-plated dome  in height, weighing , weathered to green color. The dome is lit during Argentina's national holidays and other special occasions.

The main entrance, called the Entrada de Honor ("Honor Entrance"), is exclusively used for ceremonial purposes. It is made of bronze and weighs . A symbol of the Argentine Republic, it follows the typical depiction of Roman Empire generals making a declaration of Victory but in this case it is driven by the symbolic Liberty holding the reins of the horses.

The palace used to have a barber shop in the basement but it was demolished.

Statues Recovery

In 1997, with the first general restoration of facades, representatives of the Government of Buenos Aires promoted the recovery of the statues designed by Lola Mora to crown the entrance to Congress. As the sculptor had personally donated to the government of province of Jujuy, the only thing possible was to make rubbings to place in Buenos Aires. However, at that time the idea did not materialize.

Only in 2012, with the new Master Plan, the initiative gained momentum again and began to take shape. The government of Jujuy reaffirmed its ownership of the statues of Mora, so that Congress signed a treaty for the restoration of the original and creating two copies of each work by a 3D mapping, which began in January 2013. the original had suffered deterioration caused by hundred years of outdoor exposure, so it must be kept in a closed and adequate space, while one group of rubbings will be placed in its place in the Government House of Jujuy, and the other set of rubbings will be placed in the original spaces of the National Congress.

On 1 March 2014 replicas of the statues were inaugurated by President Cristina Fernandez de Kirchner at the opening of the regular session.

Gallery

See also
 Casa Rosada
 Palace of Justice of the Argentine Nation
 List of National Historic Monuments of Argentina

References
Web

Bibliography

External links

Palaces in Buenos Aires
Congress
Government buildings in Argentina
Seats of national legislatures
Government buildings completed in 1905
Neoclassical architecture in Argentina
Government buildings with domes
1905 establishments in Argentina